Beljina is a village in the municipality of Barajevo, Serbia. According to the 2002 census, the village has a population of 810 people.

References

Suburbs of Belgrade

sr:Бељина (Барајево)